"Amorfoda" (English: Fuck Love/Fucked Up Love/Fucked Love/Love Fucked) is a song by Puerto Rican rapper and singer Bad Bunny. It was released as a single by Rimas Entertainment on February 14, 2018. Bad Bunny co-wrote the song with Noah Assad, and its producers DJ Luian and Mambo Kingz. Departing from Bad Bunny's original Latin trap and reggaeton sound, "Amorfoda" is a piano ballad about regret in a relationship gone awry. The singer said it is about "something almost everyone has experienced. Everyone has been in love". Its title translates to "Fuck Love".

Background
Bad Bunny wrote "Amorfoda" a long time before his rise to fame. In an interview for Billboard, he said: "I've always loved this song because I wrote it with a lot of sentiment behind it. It's the kind of record that reminds me of the longevity of really good songs. A good song never gets old. It was just a matter of time, and it was time to come out with something different." The track's title arose when the singer was searching for a term in Portuguese to send love to the devil.

Charts

Weekly charts

Year-end charts

Certifications

References

2018 singles
2018 songs
Bad Bunny songs
Spanish-language songs
Songs written by Bad Bunny
Songs written by Edgar Semper
Songs written by Xavier Semper